Aztec or Aztek may mean:
 The Aztec civilization of Mesoamerica
 The Aztec Empire
 The Nahuatl language, also known as "Aztec"

Aztec or Aztek may also refer to:

Brands and products
 Zidovudine, trade name "Aztec"
 Aztec (chocolate), a chocolate bar manufactured by Cadbury plc
 Pontiac Aztek, a discontinued car model

Computing
Aztec C, a C compiler for a variety of older computing platforms
Aztec Code, a two-dimensional barcode

Entertainment and media
Aztec (video game), a game for the Apple II personal computer
Aztec Adventure: The Golden Road to Paradise, a game for the Sega Master System console
Aztek (character), a character in the DC Universe
Aztec (novel), a novel by Gary Jennings
Aztec Camera, a Scottish new wave band of the 1980s and mid-1990s
Aztek Escobar, a rapper
Billy Thorpe & the Aztecs, an Australian rock band of the 1960s and 1970s
The Aztecs (Doctor Who), a serial in the  Doctor Who television series

Honors
Order of the Aztec Eagle, highest honor accorded foreigners by the Mexican government

Organizations and orders
Aztec Club of 1847, an hereditary order for US Army officers who served in the Mexican–American War
 Aztec Resources, merged with Mount Gibson Iron in 2006, operated the iron ore mine on Koolan Island, Western Australia
Barrio Azteca, a Mexican-American gang

Places
Aztec, New Mexico, a city in the United States

Sports
Los Angeles Aztecs, a soccer team that competed in the North American Soccer League from 1974 to 1981
San Diego State Aztecs, the collegiate athletics and sports teams for San Diego State University

Transportation
Piper Aztec, a small twin-engine aircraft
Pontiac Aztek, a sport utility vehicle
Aztec GT, Aztec II, Aztec 7, kit car models made by Fiberfab

See also
Azteca (disambiguation)